C.N. Liew, a pioneer of contemporary ink from South East Asia, was born in Kuala Lumpur, Malaysia. Liew is the first artist whose contemporary calligraphy works have been collected by the National Palace of Malaysia. In 2016, Asia Week named C.N. Liew as the “World Outstanding Young Leaders Award” winner for his contribution in art. 

Liew’s creations imbue Zen and philosophical elements as well as a fusion of traditional and contemporary aesthetics. He works with a variety of media including ink, calligraphy, acrylic, watercolour, sculpture and has collaborated with other artists from different fields, incorporating his art in contemporary dance, musicals and fashion. 

The National Art Gallery of Malaysia has presented “C.N. Liew: Beyond the Borders” in 2020. Liew was the first contemporary ink art artist to be invited to present a solo exhibition at the National Art Gallery of Malaysia, the most esteemed art institution in the nation. 

Liew’s works are in the collection of the National Art Gallery and the National Palace of Malaysia, University of Cambridge, Peking University, Xiamen University (Universitas Amoiensis), Embassy of the People’s Republic of China, Tokyo Fuji Art Museum, Fo Guang Shan Buddha Museum in Taiwan, The Academy of Contemporary Ink Art of Shanghai Institute of Visual Arts and many important private collections across Asia, Europe and the United States. Various renown archives such as Asia Art Archive, National Art Gallery of Malaysia Artist Archive and Beijing KUART also documented and featured his works. 

Liew has been featured prominently for the past 20 years by various media platforms and journals showcasing his evolving creativity. Since his journey in 2000 to date, his works has been featured across more than a hundred publications in various media. 

In January 2023, Liew presented an exhibition “C.N. Liew: Rocks from Yon Hills” at Clare Hall, University of Cambridge in the United Kingdom, debuting his “The Rocks” series in Europe. Furthermore, Liew’s “Beyond the Border” and “The Great Refinement” series will be featured at the Kunming Art Biennale in China, a highly established academic event that showcase major works by the most prominent artists from around the world. 

劉慶倫，生於吉隆坡，祖籍深圳寶安；是東南亞的當代水墨先鋒。

劉慶倫是馬來西亞國家美術館史上首位舉行當代水墨個展及發表當代水墨專題演講的藝術家。國際時事評論媒體《亞洲週刊》評選他為【第一屆全球傑出青年領袖獎】得獎人，同時也是馬來西亞自1957年獨立以來，史上第一位獲得國家大皇宮收藏當代書法作品的華人藝術家。

《亞洲藝術文獻庫》(Asia Art Archieve)、馬來西亞國家美術館藝術家檔案庫、北京《庫藝術》十年學術研究文獻《觀念中的水墨2008-2019》均收錄有劉慶倫之藝術檔案。

劉慶倫於2005年獲得韓國首爾市政府聯辦的【首屆首爾國際書藝雙年展】大會特別獎；他的作品發表於巴塞爾藝術展(Art Basel)、邁阿密藝術展(Art Miami)、香港典亞藝博(Fine Art Asia)、水墨藝博(Ink Asia)等，同時獲得馬來西亞國家美術館、馬來西亞國家大皇宮、中華人民共和國大使館、東京富士美術館、高雄佛陀紀念館、上海視覺藝術學院當代水墨藝術研究院、以及歐美、亞洲多國公共與私人收藏。

劉慶倫的創作極富禪學哲思以及當代與傳統共生的美學內涵；創作層面涵蓋繪畫、書法、雕塑以及跨領域聯合創作的水墨音樂劇等。

劉慶倫近期的綜合媒材系列《臨界境》, 宏觀探討當代『衝突與和諧』的核心價值觀。

《大書寫》系列，則以既獨創又親切的極簡之道，喚起思維的激蕩。

《石頭計》系列，沿襲一貫思路，以石喻師，寓石為鏡，觀照當代世象。

近20年來，劉慶倫相繼在國際評論媒體、藝術專刊、報章等，發表多篇與當代重要藝術家的訪談對話及論文。

1999年至今出版與編著計十餘種，個聯展五十餘次，國內外電子或平面媒體訪問、報導及藝術對話等計百餘篇。

Archive 

C.N. Liew (1975- ) is a Malaysian Chinese painter and calligrapher based in Hong Kong. His artwork was also the first Chinese calligraphy collected by the Malaysian Royal Palace. He is also an alumnus of Chong Hwa Independent High School, Kuala Lumpur. In celebration of Chong Hwa's Schools 100th anniversary, he has contributed his calligraphic inscriptions on its cover for the school's commemorative stamps.

In 2005, C.N. Liew ‘s “Surrealligraphy” won the “Special Award of the First Seoul International Calligraphy Biennial”. In 2012, C.N. Liew became the first
Malaysian artist to exhibit at Art Basel, Fine Art Asia, and Art Miami. 2016 Asian Weekly named C.N. Liew as the “World Outstanding Young Leaders Award” winner.

Selected Public & Private Collections 

Prime Minister's Office of Malaysia
National Art Gallery of Malaysia
Seoul Calligraphy Biennale
Singapore Nei Xue Tang Museum
Plum Plossoms Gallery in Hong Kong
Soka Gakkai Malaysia
Dr. Ikeda Daisaku - Recipient of United Nations Peace Award 1983; Poet Laureate
Mr. Tan Swie Hian -  Member-Correspondent, Academy of Fine Arts, Institute of France; Recipient of Crystal Award 2003
Mr. Liu Chang Le - CEO of Phoenix TV (Hong Kong)
Su An Sam Sa - Renowned Zen Art Master, National Treasure of Korea
Mr. & Mrs Ko Kheng Hwa - Managing Director of the Economic Development Board of Singapore
CMY Capital
YTL Corporation

References 

<div>

External links 
 Collection of his past works
 C.N. Liew with his teacher, The Venerable Bo Yuan
 Excerpt of C.N. Liew's Exclusive Interview of Nobel Prize Laureate, Renowned Artist Mr. Gao Xing Jian from Asiaweek
 
  CN Liew Yazhou Zhoukan Asia Brand Excellence Award 2013

Malaysian painters
Living people
Year of birth missing (living people)
Malaysian people of Chinese descent